Pira or PIRA may refer to:

Places
 Pira, Victoria, a locality in Australia
 Pira, Benin, a town
 Pira District, Huaraz Province, Peru
 Pira, Tarragona, Spain

Organisations
 Physics Instructional Resource Association
 Provisional Irish Republican Army

Other uses
 Pirah, a wide-tipped Filipino sword